Savin Hill Beach is a public beach in the Dorchester neighborhood of Boston, Massachusetts. It is proximate to Malibu Beach.

The closest subway stop is Savin Hill on the MBTA Red Line.

Beaches of Massachusetts
Landforms of Boston
Tourist attractions in Dorchester, Boston